Sri Lanka, as "Ceylon", was conquered by the Portuguese in 1505, who were then followed by the Dutch, who introduced the Reformed Church, then came the British, who under the orientalist and civil servant William Tolfrey (1778?–1817) translated a Sinhala language Bible by 1823. BFBS revision of the Sinhalese Bible occurred from 1895–1910.

References

Sinhalese culture
Christianity in Sri Lanka
Sinhalese